Lin Kun-han (born 5 January 1968), is a Taiwanese baseball player who competed in the 1992 Summer Olympics.

He was part of the Chinese Taipei baseball team which won the silver medal. He played as infielder.

External links
profile

1968 births
Living people
Asian Games bronze medalists for Chinese Taipei
Asian Games medalists in baseball
Baseball pitchers
Baseball players at the 1992 Summer Olympics
Baseball players at the 1998 Asian Games
Medalists at the 1992 Summer Olympics
Medalists at the 1998 Asian Games
Mercuries Tigers players
Olympic baseball players of Taiwan
Olympic medalists in baseball
Olympic silver medalists for Taiwan
People from Changhua County
Taipei Gida players
Taiwanese baseball players